Cristonia is a genus of flowering plants in the family Fabaceae. It is native to Australia.

References

Brongniartieae
Fabaceae genera